Tra Vinh University is a public university, was formed regarding the Decision No. 141/QĐ/2006-TTg dated on June 19, 2006 by the Prime Minister, located at No. 126, Nguyen Thien Thanh, Ward 5, Tra Vinh city, Tra Vinh Province, Vietnam.

History
2001: Tra Vinh University (TVU), formerly known as Tra Vinh Community College, was formed in 2001 under the Vietnam and Canada Community College Project. The project was funded and supported technologies by Canadian International Development Agency, Canada Association of Community Colleges (ACCC), a variety of institutes in Canada such as Saskatchewan Institute of Science and Applied Technology (SIAT), Marine Institute (MI), Québec Institute of Technology of Agriculture (ITA), and Malaspina University and College, and Vietnam Government.
2006: On June 19, Tra Vinh Community College was upgraded the University status and renamed Tra Vinh University, a public university.

The university has to report and be directly responsible for its operation to the managing unit – Tra Vinh People Committee and the Ministry of Training and Education (MOET).

All programs and courses, including associate programs are designed and carried out in accordance with the developmental needs of communities under the permission of MOET.

Within ten years of its formation and development, the university gradually confirmed its scale and training quality in the Mekong Delta. The number of students increased from two hundred in the first course in July 2002 to twenty thousand in different majors. The number of graduated students often increases 70%, especially the number of students who achieve employment after one graduation year is 90%.

Currently 
Currently, Tra Vinh University has 13 Schools of: Agriculture and Aquaculture; Applied Chemistry; Basic Science; Economics and Law; Education; Engineering Technology; Foreign Languages; Medicine and Pharmacy - TVU Hospital; Southern Khmer Language, Culture and Art; Political Theory; Public Management, Office Administration and Tourism; Odonto- stomatology; and  Pre-University.

Programs
Tra Vinh University offers three Doctoral programs including Culture Studies (Southern Khmer Culture), Business Administration and Literature Teaching Methodology, and fifteen Master programs (updated in July, 2017) consisting of Culture Studies, Business Administration, Economic Law, Rural Development, Chemical Technology, Economics Management, Literature Teaching Methodology, English Teaching Methodology, Veterinary, Finance-Banking, Electricity Technology, Civil and Procedural Law, Constitutional and Administrative Law, Information Technology and Accounting.
Tra Vinh University has launched 28 postgraduate programs, 58 Undergraduate programs and 8 Advanced diploma programs with full-time training, associate training, part-time training and distance training. Besides, the university has designed and conducted in-service training programs responding to companies’ and localities’ learning demands.

Organization

Tra Vinh University has three Campuses at Tra Vinh City. Campus one, at 126 Nguyen Thien Thanh street, Ward 5, Tra Vinh City, Tra Vinh Province, where the administration center of the university is located.

References

Universities in Vietnam
Educational institutions established in 2001
2001 establishments in Vietnam